Adam Wilhelm Siegmund Günther (6 February 1848 – 3 February 1923) was a German geographer, mathematician, historian of mathematics and natural scientist.

Early life
Born in 1848 to a German businessman, Günther would go on to attend several German universities including Erlangen, Heidelberg, Leipzig, Berlin, and Göttingen.

Career
In 1872 he began teaching at a school in Weissenburg, Bavaria. He completed his habilitation thesis on continued fractions entitled Darstellung der Näherungswerte der Kettenbrüche in independenter Form in 1873. The next year he began teaching at Munich Polytechnicum. In 1876, he began teaching at a university in Ansbach where he stayed for several years before moving to Munich and becoming a professor of geography until he retired; he served as the university's rector from 1911 to 1913.

For some years, Günther was a member of the federal parliament, the Reichstag, and later the Bavarian parliament, representing liberal parties.  

His mathematical work included works on the determinant, hyperbolic functions, and parabolic logarithms and trigonometry.

Publications (selection) 
Darstellung der Näherungswerthe der Kettenbrüche in independenter Form. Eduard Besold, Erlangen, 1873
Vermischte Untersuchungen zur Geschichte der mathematischen Wissenschaften. Teubner, Leipzig, 1876
Lehrbuch der Determinanten-Theorie für Studirende. Eduard Besold, Erlangen, 1877
Die Lehre von den gewöhnlichen und verallgemeinerten Hyperbelfunktionen. Louis Nebert, Halle, 1881

Parabolische Logarithmen und parabolische Trigonometrie. Teubner, Leipzig, 1882

Further reading 
 Andreas Daum, Wissenschaftspopularisierung im 19. Jahrhundert: Bürgerliche Kultur, naturwissenschaftliche Bildung und die deutsche Öffentlichkeit, 1848–1914. Munich: Oldenbourg, 1998.
Josef Reindl: Siegmund Günther. Nürnberg 1908 (online copy at the Univ. Heidelberg, German)

References

1848 births
1923 deaths
20th-century German mathematicians
19th-century German mathematicians
Academic staff of the Technical University of Munich
Presidents of the Technical University of Munich
Members of the Bavarian Chamber of Deputies